Takase Station is the name of two train stations in Japan:

 Takase Station (Kagawa) (高瀬駅) in Kagawa Prefecture
 Takase Station (Yamagata) (高瀬駅) in Yamagata Prefecture